This is a list of African-American newspapers that have been published in the state of Colorado.  It includes both current and historical newspapers.  

Many of the historical newspapers were published in the late 19th and early 20th centuries, when the number of African Americans in Colorado rose from 1,163 in 1870 to 11,453 in 1910. Colorado's first African-American newspaper may have been the Denver Weekly Star, which was in circulation by 1881.

Notable newspapers in Colorado today include the Denver Weekly News, the Denver Urban Spectrum, and the African-American Voice of Colorado Springs.

Newspapers

See also
List of African-American newspapers and media outlets
List of African-American newspapers in Kansas
List of African-American newspapers in Nebraska
List of African-American newspapers in Oklahoma
List of African-American newspapers in Utah
List of newspapers in Colorado

Works cited

References

Newspapers
Colorado
African-American
African-American newspapers